The third conference of the 2021 PBA 3x3 season started on May 21, 2022, and ended on July 3, 2022. It consisted of six two-day legs and a grand final. TNT Tropang Giga became the conference's Grand Champion after defeating Purefoods TJ Titans in the Grand Finals, 21–19.

Teams
The players listed have played in at least one of the legs. The Zamboanga Valienters returned this conference after taking a leave of absence during the second conference.

1st leg

Groupings
The preliminary drawing of lots was held on May 18, 2022.

Preliminary round

Pool A

Pool B

Pool C

Pool D

Knockout stage
TNT Tropang Giga defeated Barangay Ginebra San Miguel in the finals, 18–15, to become the first leg winners.

Bracket

Quarterfinals

Semifinals

Third place game

Finals

Final standings

2nd leg

Groupings

Preliminary round

Pool A

Pool B

Pool C

Pool D

Knockout stage
Meralco Bolts 3x3 defeated Cavitex Braves in the finals, 18–17, to become the second leg winners.

Bracket

Quarterfinals

Semifinals

Third place game

Finals

Final standings

3rd leg

Groupings

Preliminary round

Pool A

Pool B

Pool C

Pool D

Knockout stage
TNT Tropang Giga defeated Purefoods TJ Titans in the finals, 21–13, to become the third leg winners.

Bracket

Quarterfinals

Semifinals

Third place game

Finals

Final standings

4th leg

Groupings

Preliminary round

Pool A

Pool B

Pool C

Pool D

Knockout stage
TNT Tropang Giga defeated Terrafirma 3x3 in the finals, 21–15, to win the fourth leg and repeat as leg winners.

Bracket

Quarterfinals

Semifinals

Third place game

Finals

Final standings

5th leg

Groupings

Preliminary round

Pool A

Pool B

Pool C

Pool D

Knockout stage
San Miguel Beermen defeated TNT Tropang Giga in the finals, 21–12, to become the fifth leg winners and deny TNT a three-peat of leg wins.

Bracket

Quarterfinals

Semifinals

Third place game

Finals

Final standings

6th leg

Groupings

Preliminary round

Pool A

Pool B

Pool C

Pool D

Knockout stage

Bracket

Quarterfinals

Semifinals

Third place game

Finals

Final standings

Legs summary

Grand Finals

Preliminary round

Pool A

Pool B

Knockout stage

Bracket
Seed refers to the position of the team after six legs. Letter and number inside parentheses denotes the pool letter and pool position of the team, respectively, after the preliminary round of the Grand Finals.

Quarterfinals

Semifinals

Third place game

Finals

Notes

References

3x3 3rd
Pba 3rd conference